Walter Stacy Keach Jr. (born June 2, 1941) is an American actor and narrator. He has played mainly dramatic roles throughout his career, often in law enforcement or as a private detective. His most prominent role was as Mickey Spillane's fictional detective Mike Hammer, which he played in numerous stand-alone television films and at least three television series throughout the 1980s and 1990s. The role earned him a Golden Globe Award nomination in 1984.

He has appeared as the lead in films such as Fat City and The Ninth Configuration. He has also performed as a narrator for programs including CNBC'S American Greed (2008–) and various educational television programs. Comedic roles include Ken, the father of comedian Christopher Titus in the FOX sitcom Titus (2000–2002), and as Sergeant Stedenko in Cheech & Chong's films Up in Smoke (1978) and Nice Dreams (1981). Keach won a Golden Globe Award and was nominated for a Primetime Emmy Award for the television miniseries Hemingway (1988). He is an inductee of the Theatre Hall of Fame and was honored with a star on The Hollywood Walk of Fame in 2019.

Early life
Keach was born in Savannah, Georgia, to Mary Cain, an actress, and Stacy Keach Sr., a theatre director, drama teacher, and actor with dozens of television and theatrical film credits billed as "Stacy Keach." His brother James is an actor and television director. Keach graduated from Van Nuys High School in June 1959, where he was class president, then earned two BA degrees at the University of California, Berkeley (1963): one in English, the other in Dramatic Art. He earned a Master of Fine Arts at the Yale School of Drama in 1966 and was a Fulbright Scholar at the London Academy of Music and Dramatic Art.

While studying in London, Keach met Laurence Olivier, his acting hero.

Career

Theatre

Keach played the title role in MacBird!, an Off-Broadway anti-war satire by Barbara Garson staged at the Village Gate in 1966. In 1967, he was cast, again Off-Broadway, in George Tabori's The Niggerlovers with Morgan Freeman in his acting debut. To this day, Freeman credits Keach with teaching him the most about acting. In 1967, Keach also starred in We Bombed in New Haven, a play by Joseph Heller that premiered in New Haven at the Yale Repertory Theatre and later was produced on Broadway. Keach first appeared on Broadway in 1969 as Buffalo Bill in Indians by Arthur Kopit. Early in his career, he was credited as Stacy Keach Jr. to distinguish himself from his father. He played the lead actor in The Nude Paper Sermon, an avant-garde musical theatre piece for media presentation, commissioned by Nonesuch Records by composer Eric Salzman.

Keach has won numerous awards, including Obie Awards, Drama Desk Awards and Vernon Rice Awards. In the early 1980s, he starred in the title role of the national touring company of the musical Barnum, composed by Cy Coleman. In 1991 and 1996 he won Helen Hayes Awards for Outstanding Actor for his work in Richard III and Macbeth with the Shakespeare Theatre Company. In 1998, he was one of the three characters in a London West End production of 'Art' with David Dukes and George Wendt.

In 2006, Keach performed the lead role in Shakespeare's King Lear at the Goodman Theatre in Chicago. In 2008, he played Merlin in Lerner and Loewe's Camelot, done with the New York Philharmonic. In the summer of 2009, Shakespeare Theatre Company remounted the production of King Lear at Sidney Harman Hall in Washington, D.C., for which Keach won another Helen Hayes Award for Outstanding Actor.

He has played the title role in two separate productions of Hamlet.

In 2008 and 2009, Keach portrayed Richard M. Nixon in the U.S. touring company of the play Frost/Nixon.

On December 16, 2010, Keach began performances as patriarch Lyman Wyeth in the off-Broadway premiere of Jon Robin Baitz' acclaimed new play Other Desert Cities. The production transferred to Broadway's Booth Theatre, where it opened November 3, 2011.

Keach is a founding member of L.A. Theatre Works. He has performed leads in many productions with the company, including 'Willy Loman' in Death of a Salesman and 'John Proctor' in The Crucible.

He was scheduled to return to Broadway in December 2014 in the revival of Love Letters at the Brooks Atkinson Theatre alongside Diana Rigg, but the production closed before Keach and Rigg began their runs.

Keach was scheduled to play Ernest Hemingway in Jim McGrath's one-man play Pamplona at the Goodman Theatre in Chicago from May 30 to June 25, 2017. Keach appeared in previews of Pamplona, May 19 through May 28, and was well received by audiences.  On opening night, he suffered a mild heart attack on stage and the next day, Keach had bypass surgery. On June 2, the Goodman Theatre announced that the entire run would be canceled after Keach's doctors advised a period of rest and recuperation.

Keach returned to the role at The Goodman one year later, July 10 through August 18, 2018.  Keach said it would fulfill an obligation "to the play, to the city and to myself".

Music

Keach is an accomplished pianist and composer. He sang backing vocals on the Judy Collins hit song "Amazing Grace". He is also credited with co-writing a song, "Easy Times", on the Judy Collins live album Living.
He provided music for the film Imbued, directed by Rob Nilssen. He has also completed composing the music for the Mike Hammer audio radio series, "Encore For Murder", written by Max Collins, directed by Carl Amari, and produced by Blackstone Audio.

Films
Keach played a rookie policeman in The New Centurions (1972), opposite George C. Scott. That year he also starred in Fat City, a boxing film directed by John Huston. He was the first choice for the role of Damien Karras in the 1973 movie The Exorcist, but he did not accept the role. He went on to play Kane in the 1980 movie The Ninth Configuration, written and directed by Exorcist author William Peter Blatty; this role was itself intended for Nicol Williamson.

Keach was narrator of the 1973 Formula One racing documentary Champions Forever, The Quick and the Dead by Claude du Boc. He played Cheech & Chong's police department nemesis Sgt. Stedenko in Up in Smoke and Nice Dreams. He also appeared as Barabbas in Jesus of Nazareth. In 1978, he played a role of explorer and scientist in The Mountain of the Cannibal God, co-starring former Bond girl Ursula Andress. The film became a cult favorite as a "video nasty". Another one of his screen performances was as Frank James (elder brother of Jesse) in The Long Riders (1980). His brother James played Jesse James. Keach starred in the 1981 Australian thriller Roadgames alongside Jamie Lee Curtis. In 1982, Keach starred in Butterfly with Pia Zadora and Orson Welles. In the 1993 movie, Body Bags he played a man who is obsessed with hair.

He portrayed a white supremacist in American History X, alongside Edward Norton and Edward Furlong. In Oliver Stone's 2008 biographical film W., Keach portrays a Texas preacher whose spiritual guidance begins with George W. Bush's AA experience, but extends long thereafter.

Keach also starred in the TV film Ring of Death playing a sadistic prison warden who runs an underground fight club where prisoners compete for their lives. He had also starred in the movie Planes as Skipper Riley, main character Dusty Crophopper's flight instructor. He reprised the role in Planes: Fire & Rescue.

In 2012, Keach had a supporting role in The Bourne Legacy, and in the 2013 Alexander Payne film Nebraska. In the 2017 film Gotti, Keach played the part of Neil Dellacroce, the underboss of the Gambino crime family.

Television

Keach's first-ever experience as a series regular on a television program was playing the lead role of Lieutenant Ben Logan in Caribe in 1975. He played Barabbas in 1977's Jesus of Nazareth, and portrayed Jonas Steele, a psychic and Scout of the United States Army in the 1982 CBS miniseries, The Blue and the Gray.  He later portrayed and is best known as Mike Hammer in the CBS television series Mickey Spillane's Mike Hammer and The New Mike Hammer from 1984 to 1987. He returned to the role of Hammer in Mike Hammer, Private Eye, a new syndicated series that aired from 1997 to 1998.  In 1988, he starred as Ernest Hemingway in the made-for-TV movie Hemingway. He also hosted segments for the Encore Mystery premium cable network in the late 1990s and 2000s.

In 2000, he played Ken Titus, the sarcastic, chain-smoking, five-times-divorced functional alcoholic father of the title character in Fox's sitcom Titus. Cast members of Titus have commented they enjoyed working with Keach because he would find a way to make even the driest line funny.

Keach lent his voice to The Simpsons episodes "Hungry, Hungry Homer", "Old Yeller-Belly", "Marge and Homer Turn a Couple Play", and "Waiting for Duffman", portraying Duff Brewery President Howard K. Duff VIII, and the Batman Beyond episode "Lost Soul" as an artificial intelligence. He also guest starred in a 2005 episode of the sitcom Will & Grace, and had a recurring role as Warden Henry Pope in the Fox drama Prison Break.

In 2006, he acted in the mini-series Blackbeard, made for the Hallmark Channel. It was directed by Kevin Connor, and starred Angus Macfadyen, with Richard Chamberlain, David Winters, and Jessica Chastain. In 2011, Keach co-starred as "Pops", the father of the main character in the short lived boxing drama series Lights Out.

In November 2013, Keach appeared on the Fox comedy series Brooklyn Nine-Nine, in the episode "Old School". In February 2015, Keach started guest appearing in NCIS: New Orleans as Cassius Pride, father of NCIS Agent Dwayne Pride. He played the elderly father Bob on the 2016 sitcom Crowded. Beginning in 2016, Keach occasionally appears on CBS's drama Blue Bloods as Archbishop Kevin Kearns. In 2017, Keach started guest appearing in Man with a Plan as Joe Burns, father of Adam Burns (played by co-star Matt LeBlanc) and was later promoted to series regular status for season three.

Narrator
Keach narrated several episodes of Nova, National Geographic, and various other informational series. From 1989 to 1992, he was host of the syndicated informational reenactment show, Missing Reward, which had a similar format to the popular Unsolved Mysteries at the time. From 1992 to 1995, he became the voice-over narrator for the paranormal series Haunted Lives: True Ghost Stories.

Beginning in 1999, he served as the narrator for the home video clip show World's Most Amazing Videos, which is now seen on Spike TV. He currently hosts The Twilight Zone radio series.  Keach can also be heard narrating the CNBC series American Greed.  For the PBS series American Experience, he narrated The Kennedys, among others.

In 2008, Keach once again reprised his famous role as Mike Hammer in a series of full-cast radio dramatizations for Blackstone Audio. (He also arranged and performed the music for the audio dramas. His wife, Malgosia Tomassi, also starred in the dramas, playing Maya Ricci, a yoga instructor.) Keach has also read many of Mickey Spillane's original Mike Hammer novels as Audiobooks.

Keach played the role of John in The Truth & Life Dramatized Audio Bible, a 22-hour audio version of the RSV-CE translation of the New Testament. He also voiced both Job and Paul the Apostle in The Word of Promise, a 2007 dramatic audio presentation based on the New King James Version.

On January 6, 2014, Keach became the official voice of The Opie and Anthony Channel on SiriusXM Satellite Radio (Sirius Channel 206, XM Channel 103). Keach is the voice of CNBC's American Greed, now on their thirteenth season.

Personal life

Keach was born with a cleft lip and a partial cleft of the hard palate, and he underwent numerous operations as a child. Throughout his adult life he has usually worn a mustache to hide the scars. He is now the honorary chairman of the Cleft Palate Foundation and advocates for insurance coverage for surgeries.

In 1984, police in London arrested Keach at Heathrow Airport for importation of cocaine. Keach pleaded guilty, and served six months at Reading Prison.

Keach stated that his time in prison, which he described as the lowest point of his life, and the friendship he formed with a priest during that time led to his conversion to Roman Catholicism. Subsequently, he and his wife met Pope John Paul II. His wife, Małgorzata Tomassi, had attended the same school in Warsaw as the pope.

Keach has been married four times: to Kathryn Baker in 1964, to Marilyn Aiken in 1975, to Jill Donahue in 1981, and to Małgorzata Tomassi in 1986. He has two children with Małgorzata: son Shannon Keach and daughter Karolina Keach. In 2015, Keach became a Polish citizen.

Honors
In 2015, Keach was inducted into the American Theater Hall of Fame. In 2019, he received a star on the Hollywood Walk of Fame.

Filmography

Films

Television

Dubbing

References

External links

 
 
 
 
 BroadwayWorld.com interview with Stacy Keach, September 23, 2008

1941 births
Living people
Actors from Savannah, Georgia
Alumni of the London Academy of Music and Dramatic Art
American expatriates in England
American male film actors
American male Shakespearean actors
American male stage actors
American male television actors
American male voice actors
American people convicted of drug offenses
American people of English descent
Best Miniseries or Television Movie Actor Golden Globe winners
American Roman Catholics
Catholics from Georgia (U.S. state)
Converts to Roman Catholicism
Keach family
Male actors from Georgia (U.S. state)
Obie Award recipients
Polish people of American descent
Naturalized citizens of Poland
University of California, Berkeley alumni
Van Nuys High School alumni
Yale School of Drama alumni
20th-century American male actors
21st-century American male actors
Fulbright alumni